Gara Boyuk Khanim Castle is one of the two Shusha castles that have survived to nowadays (the second is Panahali Khan's castle). The inscription above the entrance to the castle says that it was built in 1182 AH (1768).

By the order of the Cabinet of Ministers of the Republic of Azerbaijan dated with 2 August 2001, the castle was taken under the state protection as an architectural monument of national importance (No. 339).

History 

For the overwhelming majority of the feudal cities, there was characteristic the presence of fortified citadels built within the city on naturally protected hills. These citadels, which were the architectural and planning dominant of the newly created cities, housed the palace complex, fortifications and other structures designed to serve the ruler and ensure his safety. In Azerbaijan, in the 16-18th centuries, the rulers' citadel was called Icheri Gala (the inner fortress), sometimes Bala Gala (the small fortress) or Ark (as, for example, the citadel of Tabriz).

Usually the construction of a feudal city began with the construction of the ruler's citadel. During the construction of Shusha, due to the peculiar and strategic advantageous qualities of the Shusha plateau, the construction of castles, including the one of Panahali Khan himself, was carried out simultaneously with the construction of the defensive walls of the fortress. According to Mirza Adygozel bey, during the reign of Panahali Khan, “spacious houses and high palaces” were built in Shusha for the members of the Khan's family.

Only two castles located in the southeastern part of Shusha have survived to nowadays. One of them is the castle of Gara Boyuk Khanim, standing on a hill, the second is the castle of Panahali Khan, which stands at the edge of a cliff over a deep ravine.

Architectural features 
The architectural originality of the castles in the Shusha fortress attracted the attention of the travelers and guests of the city. For example, in the middle of the 19th century, the newspaper Kavkaz noted:

Focusing on the undated master plan, we can conclude that almost all Shusha castles had the same configuration being rectangular in plan, and surrounded, on all four sides, by defensive walls with three-quarter towers at the corners. From the inside, the premises were attached to these walls serving as housing for the inhabitants of the castles. The volumetric-spatial and planning solution of the Shusha castles was created under the influence of the Shahbulag castle architecture.

The main entrances of the castles were facing north, similarly to the Shahbulag castle, being protected from a direct access by prismatic gate towers with L-shaped passages extended outward.

The one-story residential and utility rooms included in the palace complex were located along the inner perimeter of the building. On their roofs, at a height of 1.5 meters, loopholes were placed in the walls of the castle. Thus, the roofs of the residential buildings were used as defensive platforms.

Although the main entrance of the castle, facing north, was designed in the same way as the entrance to the palace of Ibrahimkhalil Khan, here the prismatic volume protruding forward was two-story. On the second floor of the palace lived its owner together with the family members. The walls of the rooms and the arched ceilings were decorated with paintings.

The towers of the fortress walls surrounding the palace complex were two-tiered and narrowed as their height increased. The towers had a domed roof.

Both the ceiling and the walls of the palace building were carefully and neatly built from well-hewn small stones.

References

Literature
 
 
 

18th-century establishments
Landmarks in Azerbaijan
Buildings and structures in Shusha